Pandemic is a 2018 medical thriller novel by Robin Cook. The book centers around the molecule called CRISPR/Cas9, which can be custom-tailored to find and alter genes in living organisms.

Plot
A seemingly healthy woman with a transplanted heart suffers from acute respiratory distress and dies on the New York subway. Jack Stapleton, a medical examiner and a character frequently appearing in Cook's novels, does the autopsy and suspects that the death could be due to a flu-like virus. While investigating the mysterious heart transplant of the dead woman, he finds out a larger conspiracy. He meets Wei Zao, a Chinese billionaire businessman who holds a double Ph.D. in molecular biology and genetics. Further cases of flu-like virus get reported in many other parts of the world and Jack determines to stop the pandemic from spreading.

References

2018 American novels
Novels by Robin Cook
G. P. Putnam's Sons books